Güines is a municipality and town in the Mayabeque Province of Cuba. It is the most populated town, but not the capital, of its province.

History 
The city was founded in 1737 by the Spanish. Prior to the arrival of the Spanish, what is now Güines was part of a region ruled by the Indian chief Habaguanex.

One of the earliest mentions of the word Güines is in 1598, when Don Diego de Rivera or Ribera was awarded a land grant for Los Güines Corral.

Güines can be considered one of the primary points of Cuba's transformation into a sugar-producing slave society in the wake of the Haitian Revolution. Its demographics radically changed as a result. As the historian Ada Ferrer explains, "people classified as white had accounted for about three-quarters of the population in 1775" but "by the 1820s, they constituted less than 38 percent."

In 1837, a railway was opened from Havana - the first in Cuba and Spain, and one of the earliest in the Americas.

Geography 
The municipality is divided into the barrios of Catalina, Norte, Rural Primero, Rural Segundo, Rural Tercero, Rural Cuarto and Sur.

Demographics 
In 2004, the municipality of Güines had a population of 68,951.

Notable people 
Cristina Ayala (1856–1936), poet
Julio Moreno (1921–1987), baseball player
Roberto Torres (born 1940), musician
Leinier Domínguez (born 1983), chess player

See also 
Municipalities of Cuba
List of cities in Cuba
Güines Municipal Museum

References

External links 

Guineros.com
Facebook

 
Cities in Cuba
Populated places in Mayabeque Province
1737 establishments in the Spanish Empire